Marrawijinie Cave is cave located in the Australian state of South Australia within the gazetted locality of Nullarbor on the Nullarbor Plain.

This cave is open to the public but safety precautions should be taken before driving off the Eyre Highway.

The main entry is a doline, a collapsed cave, another two entries are close by which is typical of the Nullarbor's karst topography. Hawks and Swallows use the caves as nesting sites.

One of the entries has hand stencils made from ochre drawn by Indigenous Australians on the walls.

Since June 2013, the cave has been located within the protected area known as the Nullarbor Wilderness Protection Area.

See also
 Sanctum (film)
 Andrew Wight

References

Nullarbor Plain
Caves of South Australia